"Saved" is a song by American singer Ty Dolla Sign included on his debut studio album, Free TC  (2015), and features American rapper E-40. The track was released on October 16, 2015, as the third single from the album. It was written by Ty, E-40, Glenda Proby, Bobby Brackins, DJ Mustard and Twice as Nice, with production helmed by the latter two. The official music video for "Saved" was released on November 16, 2015. It was directed by Elliott Sellers.

Background
"Saved" was written by Ty, E-40, Glenda Proby, Bobby Brackins, and its producers DJ Mustard and Twice as Nice. Ty and E-40 previously collaborated on the tracks "Chitty Bang" and "That's Right". In 2015, after releasing "Only Right", "Blasé" and "When I See Ya" off his debut studio album, Free TC, Ty released "Saved" as the third official single (second sent to radio) of the album on October 16, 2015. Free TC was released on November 13, 2015.

Music video
A music video for "Saved" premiered on Ty's official YouTube channel on November 16, 2015. It was directed by Elliott Sellers, who previously directed the video for Ty's "When I See Ya". The video opens with Ty sitting atop a golden throne in the clouds. He's surrounded by women who are trying to "get saved", but he ignores them all and sings, "I ain’t gonna save her." It also shows Ty standing in the clouds and performing with E-40. The song's co-producer DJ Mustard also makes a cameo appearance. The video received acclaim by music critics. Uproxx's Beware called the video "stunning" and wrote that it "not only looks beautiful, it fits the concept". Ted Simmons of XXL commented that "the video is an example of Ty’s strength, marrying the high and the low".

Credits
Credits adapted from Free TC liner notes.

Personnel
 Vocals – Ty Dolla Sign, E-40
 Songwriting – Tyrone Griffin, Jr., Earl Stevens, Dijon McFarlane, Khaled Rohaim, Nicholas Audino, Lewis Hughes, Glenda Proby, Bobby Brackins
 Production – DJ Mustard, Twice as Nice

Charts

Weekly charts

Year-end charts

Certifications

Release history

References

External links
 

2015 singles
2015 songs
Ty Dolla Sign songs
E-40 songs
Atlantic Records singles
Song recordings produced by Mustard (record producer)
Songs written by Mustard (record producer)
Songs written by Ty Dolla Sign
Songs written by E-40
Songs written by Bobby Brackins
Songs written by Khaled Rohaim